The Roman Catholic Diocese of Barra do Garças is a diocese located in the city of Barra do Garças in the Ecclesiastical province of Cuiabá in Brazil.

History
 February 27, 1982: Established as Diocese of Barra do Garças from the Diocese of Guiratinga

Bishops
 Bishops of Barra do Garças (Latin Rite)
 Antônio Sarto, S.D.B. (1982.03.25 – 2001.05.23)
 Protógenes José Luft, S.d.C. (2001.05.23 – present)

Coadjutor bishop
Protógenes José Luft, S.d.C.(2000-2001)

References
 GCatholic.org
 Catholic Hierarchy

Roman Catholic dioceses in Brazil
Christian organizations established in 1982
Barra do Garças, Roman Catholic Diocese of
Roman Catholic dioceses and prelatures established in the 20th century
1982 establishments in Brazil